The city of Pune in western India includes numerous universities, colleges and other institutes. Due to its wide range of educational institutions it has been called the "Oxford of the East".

Universities

State University
 Savitribai Phule Pune University (formerly University of Pune

Deemed Universities
 Bharati Vidyapeeth
 Deccan College Post-Graduate and Research Institute
 Defence Institute of Advanced Technology (formerly Institute of Armament Technology)
 Dnyaneshwar Vidyapeeth
 FLAME University
 Gokhale Institute of Politics and Economics
 Indian Institute of Information Technology, Pune
 Indian Institute of Science Education and Research, Pune
 Christ University Pune Lavasa, Campus
 Indian Institute of Science Education and Research, Pune
 National Institute of Construction Management and Research
 National Defence Academy
 Tilak Maharashtra University
 Savitribai Phule Pune University
 Spicer Adventist University
 Symbiosis International University

Private Universities
 MIT University - MIT Art, Design and Technology University
 Ajeenkya DY Patil University
 Flame University
 MIT - World Peace University
 Spicer Adventist University
 Christ University Pune Lavasa, Campus
 Symbiosis International University
 Symbiosis Skills and Professional University
 Vishwakarma University

Engineering and Technology

Central Government
 Indian Institute of Information Technology, Pune

State Government
 College of Agriculture Pune
 College of Engineering Pune
 Government College Of Engineering And Research, Avasari Khurd
 Government Polytechnic Pune

Autonomous
 G. H. Raisoni College of Engineering and Management (GHRCEM)
 G. H. Raisoni Institute of Engineering and Technology (GHRIET)
 Maharashtra Academy of Engineering
 MKSSS's Cummins College of Engineering for Women
 Vishwakarma Institute of Information Technology
 Vishwakarma Institute of Technology
Maharashtra Academy of Naval Education and Training (MANET Pune)

Other
 AISSMS College of Engineering
 Army Institute of Technology, Pune
 College of Military Engineering, Pune
 Cusrow Wadia Institute of Technology
 Dhole Patil College of Engineering
 Indian Institute of Aeronautical Engineering & Information Technology
 International Institute of Information Technology, Pune
 ISB&M School of Technology
 Jayawantrao Sawant College of Engineering
 Jayawantrao Sawant Polytechnic
 Maharashtra Institute of Technology
 MIT College of Engineering 
 Modern Education Society's College of Engineering, Pune
 PES Modern College of Engineering, Pune
 Pune Institute of Computer Technology
 Pune Vidhyarthi Griha's College of Engineering and Technology
 Sinhgad Academy of Engineering
 Sinhgad Institute of Technology and Science
 Smt. Kashibai Navale College of Engineering
 Suman Ramesh Tulsiani Technical Campus - Faculty of Engineering

Management

Autonomous
 Department of Management Sciences (PUMBA)
 G. H. Raisoni College of Engineering and Management

Other
 Balaji Institute of Modern Management Pune (formerly known as Indian Institute of Modern Management)
 Institute of Management Development and Research
 MIT School of Business
 National Institute of Bank Management
 National Insurance Academy
 Symbiosis Institute of Management Studies
 Christ University Pune Lavasa, Campus
 Vishwakarma Institute of Management
 MES Garware College of Commerce
 Indira School of Business Studies

Medical
 Armed Forces Medical College (AFMC)
 B. J. Medical College
Bharati Vidhyapeeth Medical College
D.Y Patil Medical College
Kashibai Navale Medical College
Maharashtra Institute of Medical Education and Research
Symbiosis Medical College for Women
Bharat Ratna Atal Bihari vajpaye Medical College

Arts, Commerce and Science

Autonomous
 Fergusson College
 Modern College Of Arts, Science and Commerce, Chhatrapati Shivaji Maharaj Nagar,Pune

Other
 AISSMS College of Pharmacy
 Brihan Maharashtra College of Commerce
 College of Pharmacy (Pune)
 Chandrashekhar Agashe College of Physical Education
 Dnyaneshwar Vidyapeeth
 Film and Television Institute of India
 ILS Law College
 Mahindra United World College of India
 MIT Institute Of Design
 National School of Leadership
 Ness Wadia College of Commerce
 Nowrosjee Wadia College
 Sinhgad College of Pharmacy
 Sir Parshurambhau College
 Sri Shahu Mandir Mahavidyalaya
 G. H. Raisoni Junior College
 St. Mira's College for Girls
 St. Vincent College of Commerce
 Symbiosis Centre for Management Studies
 Symbiosis Institute of Computer Studies and Research
 Symbiosis Law School
 Symbiosis School of Economics

Research institutes
 Centre for Development of Advanced Computing
 Indian Institute of Science Education and Research, Pune
 Inter-University Centre for Astronomy and Astrophysics
 National Centre for Cell Science
 National Centre for Radio Astrophysics, which operates the Giant Metrewave Radio Telescope
 National Chemical Laboratory
 National Institute of Virology

See also
 List of schools in Pune

References

Pune
Universities and colleges in Pune
Education in Pune
Pune-related lists
Pune

best colleges list Pune